Mahīśāsaka is one of the early Buddhist schools according to some records. Its origins may go back to the dispute in the Second Buddhist council. The Dharmaguptaka sect is thought to have branched out from Mahīśāsaka sect toward the end of the 2nd or the beginning of the 1st century BCE.

History
There are two general accounts of the circumstances surrounding the origins of the Mahīśāsakas. The Theravādin Dipavamsa asserts that the Mahīśāsaka sect gave rise to the Sarvāstivāda sect. However, both the Śāriputraparipṛcchā and the Samayabhedoparacanacakra record that the Sarvāstivādins were the older sect out of which the Mahīśāsakas emerged. Buswell and Lopez also state that the Mahīśāsaka was an offshoot of the Sarvāstivādins, but group the school under the Vibhajyavāda, "a broad designation for non-Sarvastivada strands of the Sthaviranikaya", which also included the Kasyapiya.

The Mahīśāsaka sect is thought to have first originated in the Avanti region of India. Their founder was a monk named Purāṇa, who is venerated at length in the Mahīśāsaka vinaya, which is preserved in the Chinese Buddhist canon.

From the writings of Xuanzang, the Mahīśāsaka are known to have been active in Kashmir in the 4th century CE. Xuanzang records that Asaṅga, an important Yogācāra master and the elder brother of Vasubandhu, received ordination into the Mahīśāsaka sect. Asaṅga's frameworks for abhidharma writings retained many underlying Mahīśāsaka traits. André Bareau writes:

The Mahīśāsaka are believed to have spread from the Northwest down to Southern India including Nāgārjunakoṇḍā, and even as far as the island of Sri Lanka. According to A. K. Warder, the Indian Mahīśāsaka sect also established itself in Sri Lanka alongside the Theravāda, into which they were later absorbed.

In the 7th century CE, Yijing grouped the Mahīśāsaka, Dharmaguptaka, and Kāśyapīya together as sub-sects of the Sarvāstivāda, and stated that these three were not prevalent in the "five parts of India", but were located in the some parts of Oḍḍiyāna, the Kingdom of Khotan, and Kucha.

Appearance
Between 148 and 170 CE, the Parthian monk An Shigao came to China and translated a work which describes the color of monastic robes (Skt. kāṣāya) utilized in five major Indian Buddhist sects, called Da Biqiu Sanqian Weiyi. Another text translated at a later date, the Śāriputraparipṛcchā, contains a very similar passage corroborating this information. In both sources, members of the Mahīśāsaka sect are described as wearing blue robes. The relevant portion of the Mahāsāṃghika Śāriputraparipṛcchā reads, "The Mahīśāsaka school practice dhyāna, and penetrate deeply. They wear blue robes."

Doctrines
According to the Mahīśāsakas, the Four Noble Truths were to be meditated upon simultaneously.

The Mahīśāsaka sect held that everything exists, but only in the present. They also regarded a gift to the Saṃgha as being more meritorious than one given to the Buddha. They disagreed with the Dharmaguptakas on this point, as the Dharmaguptakas believed that a giving a gift to the Buddha is more meritorious than giving one to the Saṃgha.

The earlier Mahīśāsakas appear to have not held the doctrine of an intermediate state between death and rebirth, but later Mahīśāsakas accepted this doctrine.

Works

Mahīśāsaka Vinaya
The Indian Mahīśāsaka sect also established itself in Sri Lanka alongside the Theravāda, into which these members were later absorbed. It is known that Faxian obtained a Sanskrit copy of the Mahīśāsaka vinaya at Abhayagiri vihāra in Sri Lanka, c. 406 CE. The Mahīśāsaka Vinaya was then translated into Chinese in 434 CE by Buddhajiva and Zhu Daosheng. This translation of the Mahīśāsaka Vinaya remains extant in the Chinese Buddhist canon as Taishō Tripiṭaka 1421.

Mahāyāna works
It is believed that the  Mahāyāna Infinite Life Sutra was compiled in the age of the Kushan Empire, in the 1st and 2nd centuries CE, by an order of Mahīśāsaka bhikkhus that flourished in the Gandhara region. It is likely that the longer Sukhāvatīvyūha owed greatly to the Lokottaravāda sect as well for its compilation, and in this sūtra there are many elements in common with the Mahāvastu. The earliest of these translations show traces of having been translated from the Gāndhārī language, a Prakrit used in the Northwest. It is also known that manuscripts in the Kharoṣṭhī script existed in China during this period.

Views on women
The Mahīśāsaka sect believed that it was not possible for women to become buddhas. In the Nāgadatta Sūtra, the Mahīśāsaka view is criticized in a narrative about a bhikṣuṇī named Nāgadatta. Here, the demon Māra takes the form of her father, and tries to convince her to work toward the lower stage of an arhat, rather than that of a fully enlightened buddha:

In her reply, Nāgadatta rejects arhatship as a lower path, saying, 

The Mahīśāsaka sect held that there were five obstacles that were laid before women. These are that they may not become a cakravartin, Māra king, Śakra king, Brahma king or a Buddha. This Mahīśāsaka view is ascribed to Māra in the Nāgadatta Sūtra of the Sarvāstivādins:

The Mahīśāsakas believed that women essentially could not change the nature of their minds or physical bodies, and would cause the teachings of Buddhism to decline. Of this, David Kalupahana writes,

See also

 Schools of Buddhism
 Early Buddhist schools
 Nikaya Buddhism

References

Sources

 
 
 

Nikaya schools
Early Buddhist schools